French immigration to Jamaica began in 1791 when problems broke out in Saint Domingue, the French part of the island of Hispaniola, now modern Haiti. Thousands of French people fled from Saint Domingue and arrived in Jamaica.

History
In 1694, Jamaica came under attack by the French, led by Admiral Jean-Baptiste du Casse. The French far outnumbered their opponents, but were eventually turned back, after losing hundreds of men in the conflict; they were successful in damaging or destroying many sugar estates and plantations on Jamaica, however.

See also

 Colony of Jamaica
 French colonies

References

1791 establishments in Jamaica
Ethnic groups in Jamaica
European Jamaican
French Caribbean

Immigration to Jamaica